76P/West–Kohoutek–Ikemura is a Jupiter-family periodic comet in the Solar System with a current orbital period of 6.48 years.

The comet was initially spotted on a photographic plate by Richard M. West at the European Southern Observatory Sky Atlas Laboratory, Geneva in January 1975, when it had a brightness of magnitude 12. Inability to predict its movement from a single image meant the comet had to be presumed lost.

In late February it was accidentally rediscovered by Lubos Kohoutek at the Hamburg Observatory, Germany and independently on 1 March by Toshihiko Ikemura in Shinshiro, Japan. After further observations the comets parabolic orbit was computed, which gave a perihelion date of 23 March 1975 and proved that all three sightings were of the same object, which was accordingly designated 76P/West–Kohoutek–Ikemura.

Further calculations by Brian G. Marsden determined the comet's elliptical orbit and revealed that it had passed only 0.012 AU from Jupiter on 22 March 1972. This close approach had reduced its orbital frequency from some 30 years to the current 6.48 years and its perihelion distance from 4.78 AU to 1.60 AU.

The comet has been observed at its successive returns in 1987, 1993, 2000, 2006 and 2013.

See also
 List of numbered comets

References

External links 
 Orbital simulation from JPL (Java) / Horizons Ephemeris
 76P/West-Kohoutek-Ikemura – Seiichi Yoshida @ aerith.net

Periodic comets
0076
Comets in 2013
Astronomical objects discovered in 1975